Calorie Kun vs Moguranian is a platform arcade game developed by Vic Tokai and published by Sega in 1986.

Gameplay
The player controls "Calorie-Kun" an abstract, mole-like creature that must make its way around a number of tunnels with ladders, avoiding enemies and collecting the items placed around the screen; before quickly making its way to the exit. The player is armed with a limited number of bombs that can be used to destroy or disable enemies.

Calorie-kun faces a timer in the form of a calorie counter which is slowly counting down and may be replenished by fruit and other food items scattered throughout the level. If allowed to drop too low, Calorie-kun will grow anemic and slow down considerably. If raised too high too quickly, Calorie-kun instead becomes too fat to move around in most tunnels until the counter drops again, or may even explode if the counter reaches an extreme.

Reception 
In Japan, Game Machine listed Calorie Kun vs. Moguranian on their October 1, 1986 issue as being the tenth most-successful table arcade unit of the month.

References

External links
Calorie Kun vs. Moguranian at Arcade History

1986 video games
Arcade video games
Arcade-only video games
Sega arcade games
Vic Tokai games
Video games developed in Japan